Comaltepec may refer to:

Geography
Places in Oaxaca, Mexico:

San Juan Comaltepec
Santiago Comaltepec

Languages
Comaltepec Chinantec